The Secretary for Home and Youth Affairs is the head of the Home and Youth Affairs Bureau of the Government of Hong Kong, which is responsible for local issues, and the provision of community and youth services.

List of office holders

Registrars General, 1845–1912

Secretaries for Chinese Affairs, 1913–1941

Secretaries for Chinese Affairs, 1946–1969

Secretaries for Home Affairs, 1969–1985

 Home affairs were handled by Secretaries for District Administration between 1985 and 1989.

Secretaries for Home Affairs, 1989–1997

Secretaries for Home Affairs, 1997-2022
Political party:

Secretaries for Home and Youth Affairs, since 2022
Political party:

References

Notes

External links
Government of HKSAR
Organisation chart of Hong Kong Government

Home Affairs
Government ministers of Hong Kong
Hong Kong